Ant etkenmen (English: I Have Promised) is the national anthem of the Crimean Tatars. It was written in 1917 by Noman Çelebicihan and served as the national anthem of the short-lived Crimean People's Republic.

Lyrics

Original lyrics by Noman Çelebicihan

See also
 Ey Güzel Kırım, a famous Crimean folk song
 Hymn of Crimea, official anthem of Crimea

References 

Crimean Tatar music
European anthems
Regional songs
Crimean Tatar-language songs